The Day of the Dead is an album by composer Graham Collier featuring his composition to accompany the writings of Malcolm Lowry which was originally released on his own Mosaic label in 1978 as a double LP.

Reception

Allmusic said "Collier's love of Malcolm Lowry's texts from his time in Mexico became an obsession, and this work is the biggest payoff for it, whether or not it was understood in its own time ... Collier's vision here is focused, intense, and spiritually charged by Lowry's work. This is not some jazz with text, where a written text becomes the thematic cause of a group of instrumentalists, but more a series of passages that offered great textural and spiritual depth and dimension by this obviously on fire group of musicians. This is vanguard music, but it is far from "free jazz." The gorgeous chromatic range is almost overwhelming as these players entwine around one another, and the text, further extending the entire notion of collaboration between literature and jazz". On All About Jazz Nic Jones noted "Collier could call upon a roster of players every bit as committed to the task of taking his music off the page as Duke Ellington did and, over the course of this work, proven by likes of guitarist Ed Speight and saxophonists Alan Wakeman and Art Themen. All three turn in potent solos, highlighting the symbiotic qualities that were always a mark of Collier's writing".

Track listing
All compositions by Graham Collier with text by Malcolm Lowry

 "Parts 1 & 2" – 21:02
 "Part 3" – 8:18
 "Part 4" – 13:08
 "Part 5" – 4:48
 "Part 6" – 5:06
 "Parts 7 & 8" – 7:44
 "October Ferry" – 23:15

Personnel
Graham Collier – composer, director, keyboards
John Carbery – narrator
Harold Beckett, Pete Duncan, Henry Lowther – trumpet, flugelhorn
Alan Wakeman – tenor saxophone, soprano saxophone, bass clarinet
Art Themen – tenor saxophone, soprano saxophone
Mike Page – alto saxophone, soprano saxophone, alto flute
Malcolm Griffiths – trombone
Ed Speight – guitar
Roger Dean – piano
Roy Babbington – bass
Ashley Brown – drums, percussion
Alan Jackson – drums

References

1978 albums
Graham Collier albums